Philadelphia Ballet, formerly known as Pennsylvania Ballet is Philadelphia's largest ballet company until rebranding in 2021. The company's annual local season features six programs of classic favorites, as well as new works, including the Philadelphia holiday tradition George Balanchine's The Nutcracker. The company's artistic director is Angel Corella.

Company history

Pennsylvania Ballet was established in 1963 by Barbara Weisberger, a protégée of George Balanchine, through a Ford Foundation initiative to develop regional professional dance companies. A Philadelphia cultural institution, the company is noted for its focus on Balanchine repertoire.

The company performed in the national spotlight for the first time in 1968 at New York City Center, a debut that led to a decade of national touring, appearances on PBS’s “Dance in America” series, and a stint as the official company of the Brooklyn Academy of Music during the 1970s.

In 1982, Pennsylvania Ballet became the first major American ballet company to promote an African-American woman, Debra Austin, to principal dancer. Between 1987 and 1989, Pennsylvania Ballet forged an alliance with Milwaukee Ballet in an unprecedented venture to create one company. The new organization, with 43 dancers, was the first in the country to offer its dancers year-round employment.

In 1995, the trustees of Pennsylvania Ballet selected its first home-grown artistic director, Roy Kaiser. A former principal dancer, Kaiser had been hired as a company member in 1979 by Barbara Weisberger. Following his retirement from the stage in 1992, Kaiser served as principal ballet master and associate artistic director under Christopher d'Amboise before being named to his current position.

Under Kaiser's leadership, the company expanded its Balanchine-based repertoire to include new works from both established and emerging choreographers. New works included premieres of original ballets from choreographers Merce Cunningham, Christopher d'Amboise, Trey McIntyre, Matthew Neenan, David Parsons, Val Caniparoli, Benjamin Millepied, and Christopher Wheeldon, as well as the highly acclaimed 40th anniversary commission of Swan Lake by Christopher Wheeldon and the 2007 world premiere of Matthew Neenan's Carmina Burana. Currently employing 37 dancers, Pennsylvania Ballet annually presents a season of six programs, which includes their annual signature production of George Balanchine's The Nutcracker, that balances classic ballets with new works, and that challenges the dancers while attracting a diverse audience. The company tours throughout Pennsylvania and elsewhere, including venues such as New York City Center and the John F. Kennedy Center for the Performing Arts in Washington DC. Pennsylvania Ballet made its international debut at the Edinburgh International Festival in August 2005.

Fourteen members of Pennsylvania Ballet appeared as the corps in the 2010 film Black Swan. In September 2014, Ángel Corella was named artistic director.

In July 2021, Pennsylvania Ballet rebranded and became Philadelphia Ballet. After nearly 60-years of artistic legacy and performance in Philadelphia, this name change reflected the company's commitment to its history, inspiration, and identity. The Philadelphia Ballet II (the company's second company) provides outreach and educational performances.

Matthew Neenan, Philadelphia Ballet's first choreographer in residence, danced for the company from 1994 to 2007.

Outreach programs
Philadelphia Ballet has increased its reach through creative programming initiatives such as the Family Matinee Series, the Prologue Lecture Series, and its outreach and education program, Accent on Dance, which serves over 11,000 children each year.  Philadelphia Ballet II does around 25 shows in the Philadelphia area as well as arranging studio tours, school shows, and free tickets to Main Stage performances.

Artistic staff 
Artistic Director: Ángel Corella
Assistant Director: Samantha Dunster
Ballet Masters: Charles Askegard
Choreographer in Residence: Matthew Neenan

Dancers 
The company dancers of the Philadelphia Ballet are:

Principals

 Sterling Baca 
 Jermel Johnson
 Zecheng Liang
 Nayara Lopes
 Oksana Maslova 
 Mayara Pineiro
 Arian Molina Soca
 Jack Thomas 
 Dayesi Torriente

First Soloists
 Yuka Iseda

Soloists

 Aleksey Babayev
 Sydney Dolan
 Thays Golz
 Kathryn Manger
 Ashton Roxander
 So Jung Shin
 Peter Weil

Demi Soloists

 Etienne Diaz
 Russel Ducker
 Lucia Erickson 
 Alexandea Heier
 Jack Sprance

Corps de ballet

 Cato Berry
 Jacqueline Callahan 
 Adrianna de Svastich
 Federico D'Ortenzi 
 Austin Eyler
 Marjorie Feiring
 Siobhan Howley
 Denis Maciel
 Gabriela Mesa
 Erin O'Dea
 Fernanda Oliveira
 Nicholas Patterson
 Pau Pujol
 Sophie Savas-Carstens
 Julia Vinez

Apprentices 
 Isaac Hollis
 Mine Kusano
 Cory Ogdahl
 Jeremy Power
 Paloma Berjano Torrado
 Emily Wilson

Philadelphia Ballet II
Philadelphia Ballet II (formerly Pennsylvania Ballet II) was created in 2002 by Joyce and Herbert Kean as a second company. The dancers in this program practice frequently with the main company and are used as dancers in the larger productions. Philadelphia Ballet II also is involved with many outreach and educational programs.

 Charlie Clinton
 Isabella Diemedio
 Corinne Mulcahy
 Victoria Casals Renzetti
 Ben Schwarz
 Charlotte Erickson 
 Ashley Lewis
 Shinichiro Ebe
 Mayfield Myers
 Vinícius Ferreira Freire

Roy Kaiser has been said to have had a very influential effect on this company. He also participated in other programs such as the New York Choreographic Institute.

References

External links
 

Dance in Pennsylvania
Ballet companies in the United States
Performing groups established in 1963
1963 establishments in Pennsylvania
Non-profit organizations based in Pennsylvania
Organizations based in Philadelphia